Aristotelia rhoisella is a moth of the family Gelechiidae. It was described by August Busck in 1934. It is found in North America, where it has been recorded from California.

References

Moths described in 1934
Aristotelia (moth)
Moths of North America